Nemurella is a genus of stoneflies in the family Nemouridae. It is monotypic, being represented by the single species Nemurella pictetii. It is found in Europe.

References

Nemouridae
Plecoptera genera